Selent/Schlesen is an Amt ("collective municipality") in the district of Plön, in Schleswig-Holstein, Germany. It is situated approximately 17 km north of Plön, and 17 km east of Kiel. Its seat is in Selent.

Subdivision
The Amt Selent/Schlesen consists of the following municipalities:
Dobersdorf
Fargau-Pratjau 
Lammershagen 
Martensrade 
Mucheln 
Schlesen 
Selent

References 

Ämter in Schleswig-Holstein